The University of Genoa, known also with the acronym UniGe, is one of the largest universities in Italy. It is located in the city of Genoa and regional Metropolitan City of Genoa, on the Italian Riviera in the Liguria region of northwestern Italy. The original university was founded in 1481.

According to Microsoft Academic Search 2016 rankings, the University of Genoa has high-ranking positions among the European universities in multiple computer science fields: 
 in machine learning and pattern recognition the University of Genoa is the best scientific institution in Italy and is ranked 36th in Europe;
 in computer vision the University of Genoa is the best scientific institution in Italy and is ranked 34th in Europe;
 in computer graphics the University of Genoa is ranked 2nd institution in Italy and 35th in Europe.

The University of Genoa has a strong collaboration with the Italian Institute of Technology (IIT), since its foundation in 2005.

The University of Genoa is currently setting up a big project for a new Faculty of Engineering within the Erzelli Great Campus science technology park, in the Western side of Genoa. The contracts were signed in October 2018, the final project should be released in 2019, the construction works should start in 2020, and the new faculty should open in 2023.

The University of Genoa since its foundation has delivered 46 gold medals to the Italian students, and 2 gold medals to the international students, specifically to the Israeli student Khor Hoksari in 1993, and to the Albanian student Agasi Bledar in 2021, It has delivered 122 honoris titles to its alumni, and has been part of a continuous public opening in the last 20 years.

Campus

The University of Genoa is organized in several independent campuses located in different city areas. Notable buildings are the main university premises (Via Balbi, 5) designed by the architect Bartolomeo Bianco and built in 1640, the new complex in Valletta Puggia, built in the 1980s and 1990s and hosting the Departments of Chemistry, Computer Science, Mathematics, and Physics, and the new seat of Facoltà di Economia, realized in 1996 by refurbishing old seaport docks. The university's botanical garden, the Orto Botanico dell'Università di Genova, occupies one hectare in the city center, just above the university's main building.

University of Genoa also has a number of regional campuses in Savona, Imperia, Santa Margherita Ligure, Ventimiglia and La Spezia.

History 

Already in the 13th century in Genoa there were Colleges which conferred degrees in law, theology, medicine and arts.

The College of Theology was established officially in 1471 with a papal bull of Sixtus IV (Francesco della Rovere). Some years after dates the promulgation of a Statute of the College of Medicine by the Council of the Elders in 1481.

In 1569, by a decree of the Senate of Republic of Genoa, the Colleges were incorporated into the schools run by the Jesuits. The Jesuits settled near the old Church of San Girolamo Del Rosso, and enlarged their premises by buying some land on which to house their College and schools. The building, which is now the main university premises, was designed by the architect Bartolomeo Bianco, and began to be used in 1640.

After the suppression of the Society of Jesus in 1773, a special committee reorganized the various courses of study, dividing them in higher education (Canon Law, Philosophy, Civil Law, Theology, Logic and Metaphysics, Physics) and primary education (courses in Rhetoric, Reading and Writing).

After the establishment of the French Empire, which absorbed the Republic of Genoa, higher education was subdivided into different special schools: Law, Medicine, Physical and Mathematical Sciences, Commerce, Language and Literature, Chemistry. The University of Genoa was affiliated to the Imperial University of Paris. It was reinstated as a separate university in 1812.

After the fall of Napoleon, the provisional Government of the Republic appointed a new Committee in charge of higher education, and at the Congress of Vienna in 1815 it was decided that the University of Genoa be entrusted to the Kingdom of Sardinia, enjoying the same privileges as those granted to the University of Turin. The university was closed owing to political disturbances between 1821 and 1823 and again between 1830 and 1835.

In 1870, two first technical institutes of higher education were established: the Royal Naval School and the Royal School of Economic Studies, that in 1936 were absorbed by the Royal University of Genoa, becoming the Faculties of Engineering and Economics respectively.

In the late 20th century, the university expanded rapidly, with new regional campuses. In 1996 some departments were established in Savona within a remodeled Army Barrack area. That campus hosts the Department of Engineering and also courses in Business. New laboratories have been made in Simulation, Logistics & Industrial Engineering, among others.

In January 2001, an "Institutional Review of University of Genoa" was given by CRE Institutional Evaluation Programme. This evaluation, surveys taken and reports made, explain The university's current promotion of invitations to outside professorships and student body.

Controversies 

In 2018–2022, the university is involved in numerous scandals of rigged competitions and bought exams and theses that have undermined the credibility and reputation of the institution. Mainly involved the departments of Law and Economics.

Critical issues
Furthermore, unfortunately, it still has several organizational shortcomings post COVID-19 pandemic.
On 7 November 2022, a spy camera was found inside the women's bathrooms of the University of Genoa, in Campus of Savona, arousing alarm and apprehension among the female students and revealing a serious security problem.

Organization 
As of the academic year 2012-2013 the university is headed by a rector and it was divided into 5 schools, comprising a total of 23 departments:

 School of Natural Sciences, Mathematics and Physics
 Department of Chemistry and Industrial Chemistry (DCCI)
 Department of Physics (DIFI)
 Department of Mathematics (DIMA)
 Department of Earth, Environmental and Life Sciences (DISTAV)
 Department of Computer Science, Bioengineering, Robotics and System Engineering (DIBRIS)
 School of Medical and Pharmaceutical Sciences
 Department of Pharmaceutics (DIFAR)
 Department of Internal Medicine and Medical Specialties (DIMI)
 Department of Experimental Medicine (DIMES)
 Department of Neurosciences, Rehabilitation, Ophthalmology and Maternal-Fetal Medicine (DINOGMI)
 Department of Surgical and Integrated Diagnostic Sciences (DISC)
 Department of Health Sciences (DISSAL)
 School of Social Sciences
 Department of Economics
 Department of Law
 Department of Science Education (DISFOR)
 Department of Political Sciences (DISPO)
 School of Humanities
 Department of Antics, Philosophy and History (DAFIST)
 Department of Italian, Roman, Antics, Arts and Drama Studies (DIRAAS)
 Department of Modern Cultures and Languages
 Polytechnic School
 Department of Computer Science, Bioengineering, Robotics and System Engineering (DIBRIS)
 Department of Civil, Chemical and Environmental Engineering (DICCA)
 Department of Mechanical, Energy, Management, and Transportation Engineering (DIME)
 Department of Naval, Electrical, Electronic and Telecommunications Engineering (DITEN)
 Department of Architectural Sciences (DSA)

Rankings 

In the ranking of Italian universities, the University of Genoa is ranked 13th by ARWU, 18th by QS, and 18th by THE.

The university is ranked 151–200 in Engineering - Civil and Structural in the QS World University Subject Rankings.

Times Higher Education gave the university a rank of 150+ in the Law category in its 2020 list of subjects.

Students 

Today the university has a student population of around 40,000, including both undergraduate and graduate students. The University of Genoa shares a branch campus of Florida International University in Miami, Florida, United States, in Genoa. The two universities mutually host students of either university's School of Architecture.

Faculty 

In 2004 there were about 1,710 professors and scientific employees and about 2000 non-scientific employees working for University of Genoa, making it one of Genoa's biggest employers.

Noted alumni 
thumb|Giacomo Della Chiesa studied theology at Genoa and later became Pope Benedict XV 
Ornella Barra, graduated as a pharmacist from the University of Genoa. She worked at as a manager at a local pharmacy which she later bought. Later creating a successful pharmaceutical distribution company known as Di Pharma. Now chief executive of Alliance Healthcare, the Pharmaceutical Wholesale Division of Alliance Boots
Gianaurelio Cuniberti, Italian scientist and professor
Kostas Georgakis, anti-fascist dissident who set himself ablaze as a protest against the Greek military junta of 1967-1974
Franco Malerba, first Italian astronaut
Sandro Pertini, antifascist dissident, later 7th President of the Italian Republic
Enrico Piaggio, industrialist
Giacomo Della Chiesa, later Pope Benedict XV
Giuseppe Mazzini
Alessandro Riberi, noted physician and surgeon

See also 
 List of Italian universities
 List of Jesuit sites
 List of medieval universities

References

External links 
Official University of Genoa website———
Profile of University of Genoa on the Times Higher Education website

 
Educational institutions established in the 15th century
15th-century establishments in the Republic of Genoa
1471 establishments in Europe
Metropolitan City of Genoa
Education in Genoa